The following tables indicate party affiliation in the U.S. state of Florida for the individual elected offices of: 
Governor
Lieutenant Governor
Attorney General
Chief Financial Officer
Commissioner of Agriculture

As well as the following historical offices that were elected from 1889 to 2005:
 Secretary of State
 Comptroller
 Treasurer/Insurance Commissioner/Fire Marshal
 Commissioner of Education (called the Superintendent of Public Instruction before 1969)
The table also indicates the historical party composition in the:
State Senate
State House of Representatives
State delegation to the U.S. Senate (individually)
State delegation to the U.S. House of Representatives

For years in which a presidential election was held, the table indicates which party's nominees received the state's electoral votes. For the Civil War years, the table indicates the state's delegation to the Confederate Congress, in lieu of the U.S. Congress.

1845–1888

1889–1960

1961–2002

2003–present

See also
Elections in Florida
Government of Florida
Politics of Florida
 Parties:
Republican Party of Florida
Florida Democratic Party

References

Politics of Florida
Government of Florida
Florida